J. Tinsley Oden (born December 25, 1936 in Alexandria, Louisiana) is the Associate Vice President for Research, the Cockrell Family Regents' Chair in Engineering #2, the Peter O'Donnell, Jr. Centennial Chair in Computing Systems, a Professor of Aerospace Engineering and Engineering Mechanics, a Professor of Mathematics, and a Professor of Computer Science at The University of Texas at Austin. Oden has been listed as an ISI Highly Cited Author in Engineering by the ISI Web of Knowledge, Thomson Scientific Company.

Oden is the founding director of the Oden Institute for Computational Engineering and Sciences, which was started in January 2003 as an expansion of the Texas Institute for Computational and Applied Mathematics (TICAM), also directed by Oden for over a decade. The Oden Institute, formerly known as ICES, was named in his honor in 2019.

He earned a B.S. degree in civil engineering from LSU in 1959. Oden earned a PhD in engineering mechanics from Oklahoma State University in 1962. He taught at OSU and The University of Alabama in Huntsville, where he was the head of the Department of Engineering Mechanics prior to going to Texas in 1973. He has held visiting professor positions at other universities in the United States, England, and Brazil.

An author of over 500 scientific publications: books, book chapters, conference papers, and monographs, he is an editor of the series, Finite Elements in Flow Problems and of Computational Methods in Nonlinear Mechanics. He has published extensively in this field and in related areas over the last three decades.

Honors and awards
Oden is an Honorary Member of the American Society of Mechanical Engineers and is a Fellow of six international scientific/technical societies: IACM, AAM, ASME, ASCE, SES, and BMIA. He is a Fellow, founding member, and first President of the U.S. Association for Computational Mechanics and the International Association for Computational Mechanics. He is a Fellow and past President of both the American Academy of Mechanics and the Society of Engineering Science. Oden was awarded the A. Cemal Eringen Medal in 1989, the Worcester Reed Warner Medal, the Lohmann Medal, the Theodore von Karman Medal, the John von Neumann medal, the Newton/Gauss Congress Medal, and the Stephan P. Timoshenko Medal. He was also knighted as “Chevalier des Palmes Academiques” by the French government and he holds four honorary doctorates, honoris causa, from universities in Portugal (Technical University of Lisbon), Belgium (Faculte Polytechnique), Poland (Cracow University of Technology), and the United States (Presidential Citation, The University of Texas at Austin). Oden was also elected a member of the U.S. National Academy of Engineering in 1988 for pioneering work in computational mechanics, which significantly advanced the transformation of nonlinear continuum mechanics into a powerful and widely used engineering tool.

Books
Finite Elements of Nonlinear Continua, Dover Publications, 2006.
An Introduction to the Mathematical Theory of Finite Elements, with J. N. Reddy, John Wiley & Sons Inc., 1976.
Applied Functional Analysis, Prentice Hall, 1979.
Mechanics of Elastic Structures, 2nd ed., with E. A. Ripperger, McGraw-Hill Inc., 1981.
Finite Elements an Introduction, volume 1, with E. B. Becker and G. F. Carey, 1981.
Finite Elements in Fluids, volume 2, with O. C. Zienkiewicz, R. H. Gallagher, and C. Taylor, John Wiley & Sons, New York, 1976.
Finite Elements in Fluids, volume 4 with R. H. Gallagher, D. N. Norrie, and O. C. Zienkiewicz, Wiley, Chichester, 1982.
Finite Elements in Fluids, volume 6, with R. H. Gallagher, G. F. Carey, and O.C. Zienkiewicz, Wiley, Chichester, 1985.
State of the Art Survey in Computational Fluid Mechanics, with A. K. Noor, ASME, 1988.
Computational Methods in Nonlinear Mechanics, North-Holland, Amsterdam, 1980.

References

External links

1936 births
Living people
People from Alexandria, Louisiana
21st-century American engineers
Members of the United States National Academy of Engineering
University of Texas at Austin faculty
Oklahoma State University faculty
University of Alabama in Huntsville faculty
Oklahoma State University alumni
Louisiana State University alumni
Fellows of the Society for Industrial and Applied Mathematics
Fellows of the American Society of Mechanical Engineers